The following page lists all power stations in Slovenia.

Nuclear

Fossil fuel

Hydroelectric

Unconventional

See also 
 List of power stations in Europe
 List of largest power stations in the world

Slovenia
 
Power stations